Andrea Caroppo may refer to:

 Andrea Caroppo (footballer) (born 1990), Italian footballer
 Andrea Caroppo (politician), Italian politician